Gymnonerius is a genus of flies in the family Neriidae.

Species
Gymnonerius andamanensis Hennig, 1937
Gymnonerius apicalis (Wiedemann, 1830)
Gymnonerius ceylanicus Hennig, 1937
Gymnonerius dimidiatus Cresson, 1926
Gymnonerius fuscus (Wiedemann, 1821)
Gymnonerius hendeli Hennig, 1937

References

Brachycera genera
Neriidae
Taxa named by Friedrich Georg Hendel
Diptera of Asia